The Pac-8 League was a high school athletic conference in California that was affiliated with the CIF Southern Section (CIF-SS). Member schools were located in San Luis Obispo and northern Santa Barbara counties. Prior to the 2014–15 school year, the conference was known as the Pac-7 League; Mission Prep High School joined as the eighth member.

Member schools
As of the 2014–15 school year, the schools in the league were:

Arroyo Grande High School
Atascadero High School	
Mission College Preparatory High School
Paso Robles High School
Pioneer Valley High School
Righetti High School
San Luis Obispo High School
St. Joseph High School

Football
Arroyo Grande High School
Atascadero High School
Paso Robles High School
Righetti High School
San Luis Obispo High School

References

CIF Southern Section leagues